Lindsay Morgan (born 18 October 1979) is an Australian female rugby union player. She represented  in 14 test matches from 2006 to 2010.

Morgan competed for the Wallaroos at the 2006 Rugby World Cup in Canada. She was also a member of the squad to the 2010 Rugby World Cup that finished in third place. She was named in a 22-player squad that toured New Zealand in October.

References

1979 births
Living people
Australia women's international rugby union players
Australian female rugby union players
Female rugby union players
20th-century Australian women
21st-century Australian women